Pornocracy, from Ancient Greek  ("female prostitute") +  ("government" or "rule"), is a government ruled by prostitutes or by corrupt officials (who metaphorically "prostitute" themselves for power). It may refer to:

 Saeculum obscurum, a period in the Papacy often referred to as "pornocracy"
 Pornocrates, an 1878 painting by Félicien Rops
 Anatomy of Hell, a 2004 film by Catherine Breillat based on her 2001 novel Pornocracy
 La Pornocratie, ou les Femmes dans les temps modernes, an 1875 book by Pierre-Joseph Proudhon

See also
Pornotopia
Gynocracy